Zinc finger protein 696 is a protein that in humans is encoded by the ZNF696 gene.

References

Further reading 

Human proteins